is a Japanese footballer currently playing as a midfielder for Ehime FC as a designated special player.

Career statistics

Club
.

Notes

References

External links

2000 births
Living people
Association football people from Aichi Prefecture
Tokai Gakuen University alumni
Japanese footballers
Association football midfielders
J2 League players
Ehime FC players